Santa Teresa de Átil  also known as Santa Teresa de Ádid and Los Siete Príncipes del Átil,  is a historic Spanish mission located in the small town of Atil, Sonora.

The original mission was founded in 1687 by Jesuit missionary Eusebio Francisco Kino. Some buildings were constructed by Jesuit missionary Jacobo Sedelmayer.

On February 3, 1768, King Carlos III ordered the Jesuits forcibly expelled from New Spain and returned to the home country. That year, the Franciscans arrived to take over the mission.

In Jesuit records, the mission is called Los Siete Príncipes del Átil (The Seven Archangels of Átil). The name of the mission was changed when the Franciscans arrived in 1768.

See also
 Mission San José de Tumacacori
 San Cayetano de Tumacácori Mission
 Mission San Xavier del Bac
 Spanish Missions in the Sonoran Desert
 List of Jesuit sites

References

External links
 Teresa de Atil - in Spanish
 Translation of letter from Luis María Belderrain, dated 1792
 Photos, history, National Park Service

Missions in Sonora
1697 establishments in the Spanish Empire